The 2013–14 season was Sport Lisboa e Benfica's 110th season in existence and the club's 80th consecutive season in the top flight of Portuguese football. It involved Benfica competing in the Primeira Liga, Taça de Portugal, Taça da Liga, the group stage of the UEFA Champions League, and the knockout phase in the UEFA Europa League. Benfica qualified for the Champions League by coming second in the previous Primeira Liga.

On 4 June 2013, coach Jorge Jesus renewed his contract for a further two seasons, making him the first manager since Otto Glória in 1958–59 to start a fifth consecutive season at Benfica.

The season was one of the best in Benfica's history, as the club won its 33rd title, its fifth Taça da Liga (without conceding a single goal), reached the Europa League final for the second consecutive season (without any defeat) and won its 25th Taça de Portugal achieving the tenth double (record) of the club.
By winning the Primeira Liga, Taça de Portugal and Taça da Liga, Benfica achieved a unique treble in Portugal. Benfica also finished the season unbeaten in home matches, and the 57 games played are a club record for a single season.

Events

Pre-season
The pre-season started on 1 July 2013 with medical evaluations on the players. After a brief period of exercising at the Caixa Futebol Campus the team was due to travel on 8 July for Évian-les-Bains in France, but on 6 July, it chooses to stay at Futebol Campus instead of travelling to France, but still maintained the three pre-season games against Ètoile Carouge, Bordeaux and Sion. The team participated in the semi-finals of the tournament Lisbon Football Association Honour's Cup, where they played against Sporting CP B, using a mix of first team players like Ola John, Rodrigo or Jardel, with the remaining players from Benfica B. In the 3rd/4th place match, Benfica fielded a team with only one first-team player, Paulo Lopes. On 24, 26 and 27 July, Benfica faced Peñarol, Levante and Nice at Estádio Algarve, respectively. On 31 July, Benfica played Elche on their presentation game in Elche. They then took part in the sixth edition of the Eusébio Cup against São Paulo on 3 August, ending their pre-season on 9 August against Napoli as part of the MSC Crociere Cup.

August
18: Benfica is defeated at Estádio dos Barreiros by Marítimo in their first loss of the season. Additionally, Benfica continue their negative record in the first matchday, not winning it for the ninth consecutive season, never with Jorge Jesus, and only once during the 10-year term of Luís Filipe Vieira.
25: Benfica beat Gil Vicente with a dramatic stoppage time late goal from Lima at the 93rd minute, a minute after Marković equalizing the match. The Serbian armada was decisive in the victory, with both Sulejmani and Đuričić assisting in a goal. Earlier, Diogo Viana made it 1–0 for the  after a Maxi Pereira mistake.
29: Benfica draw Paris Saint-Germain, Olympiacos and Anderlecht in the Champions League draw.
31: In the third matchday against Sporting CP, Benfica draw at the José Alvalade. The lions took the lead after an early goal from Fredy Montero, but Lazar Marković equalized the match in a solo run past three Sporting defenders, finished by rolling the ball under goalkeeper Rui Patrício.

September
14: Benfica beat Paços de Ferreira, with an early goal from Enzo Pérez, cemented by two goals from Ezequiel Garay, the first time he scored twice at Benfica. Ljubomir Fejsa and Guilherme Siqueira made their club debut.
17: In the first day of the Champions League, Benfica beat Anderlecht with a goal from Filip Đuričić on the fourth minute, followed by a Luisão goal at the half-hour mark. Đuričić scored his first goal at Benfica and first Champions League goal, while Luisão scored his fourth Champions League goal. It was Benfica's first clean sheet of the season.
22: In Guimarães, Benfica beat Vitória de Guimarães 1–0 after a goal from Óscar Cardozo, which rebounded on Marco Matias. Vitória's David Addy was sent off earlier in the match.
28: Benfica draw with Belenenses, losing the advantage won in the previous round. Both coach and president complained of mistakes of the referee Jorge Tavares.

October
2: In the second round of the Champions League, Benfica is defeated by Paris Saint-Germain in Paris 3–0, with the players received in Lisbon under criticism from the fans.
6: At Estoril, Benfica beat the local team 1–2, with goals from Lima and Óscar Cardozo. Despite the win, the team received further criticism from the fans.
19: Benfica beat Cinfães in the third round of the Portuguese Cup, with a sole goal from Ola John, in the debut of Ivan Cavaleiro.
23: In the third day of the Champions League, at home, Benfica draw before Greek side Olympiacos, with a goal from Óscar Cardozo in the 84th minute. In a rainy night, the pitch became soaked, difficulting the task of the players. Olympiacos' Roberto and Javier Saviola returned to the Estádio da Luz.
27: Benfica beat Nacional with goals from Guilherme Siqueira and Óscar Cardozo. The Paraguayan ties Nuno Gomes for ninth place in the all-time goalscoring list for Benfica.

November
1: In Coimbra, Benfica trash Académica 3–0, with goals from Óscar Cardozo, and Lazar Marković, with an own goal completing the score.
6: Benfica lose 1–0 with Olympiacos on the fourth day of the Champions League, at the Karaiskakis Stadium. Roberto won man of the match, saving the Greek team numerous times.
9: On the fourth round of the Portuguese Cup, Benfica defeat Sporting CP 4–3. A hat-trick from Óscar Cardozo and a late goal from Luisão were enough to defeat the long-time rival. In an emotional match, which ended tied at 3–3 at regular time, the aforementioned goal from Luisão untied the score at overtime.
19: Jorge Jesus is suspended for 30 days for his actions in Guimarães by the Portuguese Football Federation (FPF).
23: In the tennth league matchday, Benfica beat Braga with a goal in the 73rd minute from Nemanja Matić.
27: On the fifth day of the Champions League, at the Constant Vanden Stock Stadium, Benfica beat Anderlecht by 3–2 with goals from Nemanja Matić and Rodrigo, and own goal from Chancel Mbemba. It was the club's first win against Anderlecht on Belgian soil.

December
1: Benfica beat Rio Ave in Vila do Conde with a goal from Rodrigo and a double from Lima.
7: In the first game of the twelve matchday, at home, Benfica draw 2–2 with Arouca with a goal from Rodrigo. David Simão, a youth graduate from Benfica, scored the visiting team's  only goal. Jesus received criticism for his options, mostly by using Bruno Cortês in the match.
10: In the final matchday of the Champions League group stage, Benfica beat Paris Saint-Germain 2–1. Lima and Nicolás Gaitán scored the goals. It meant the third time in four years, Benfica fails to progress to the knockout round of the Champions League.
15: At the Estádio do Algarve, Benfica beat Olhanense with goals from Lima, Nemanja Matić and Miralem Sulejmani. Goalkeeper Jan Oblak made his debut for Benfica following an injury to regular starter Artur.
20: Benfica beat Vitória de Setúbal at the Estádio do Bonfim, with goals from Rodrigo and Lima.
31: In the first day of the League Cup, Benfica beat Nacional after an own goal from Mexer.

January
4: In the fifth round of the Portuguese Cup, Benfica defeat Gil Vicente with a double from Rodrigo and Lima, plus another from Lazar Marković.
5: Eusébio, former Benfica player, dies aged 71.
12: Benfica beat Porto 2–0 with goals from Rodrigo and Ezequiel Garay. In a nearly sold out stadium, all Benfica players wore a black ribbon and all names on the back of the players' shirts were of Eusébio. Benfica returned to the first position on the table, after losing it to Porto in their previous league match. It was also the first time since 2009 that Benfica defeated Porto in a league match.
15: Benfica sells Nemanja Matić to Chelsea.
16: On the second matchday of the League Cup, Benfica beat Leixões 2–0, with goals from Filip Đuričić and Ivan Cavaleiro, both scoring their first goals of the season.
19: Benfica defeat Marítimo, with a double from Rodrigo.
25: On third day of the League Cup, Benfica beat Gil Vicente with a goal from Miralem Sulejmani. Benfica will face Porto in the semi-finals.
31: Benfica sells Rodrigo and André Gomes to an investment firm. Both remain at Benfica until the end of the season.

February
1: Benfica draw with Gil Vicente, at the Estádio Cidade de Barcelos, with a goal from Lima; Óscar Cardozo misses a penalty.
5: In the quarter-finals of the Portuguese Cup, Benfica beat Penafiel with a goal from Miralem Sulejmani.
11: On matchday 18, Benfica beat Sporting CP 2–0, with goals from Nicolás Gaitán and then an individual effort by Enzo Pérez. The match was scheduled to be played on February 9, but was postponed after the Estádio da Luz faced technical difficulties.
16: On the 19th matchday, Benfica beat Paços de Ferreira at the Estádio da Mata Real, with goals from Ezequiel Garay and Lazar Marković.
20: In the Round of 32 of the Europa League, Benfica defeat PAOK in Greece, with a goal from Lima.
24: In matchday 20, Benfica beat Vitória de Guimarães, with a sole goal from Lazar Marković.
25: Mário Coluna passes away at age 78.
27: Benfica beat PAOK 3–0, with goals from Nicolás Gaitán, Lima and Lazar Marković, ensuring progression to the Round of 16.

March
2: In matchday 21, Benfica beat Belenenses with a sole goal from Nicolás Gaitán.
9: On the 22nd matchday, Benfica faces Estoril, winning 2–0 with goals from Luisão and Rodrigo.
13: In the Round of 16 of the Europa League, Benfica beat Tottenham Hotspur at White Hart Lane, with a goal from Rodrigo and a double from Luisão.
17: On matchday 23, Benfica beat Nacional at the Estádio da Madeira 4–2, with goals from Lima and Rodrigo, plus a double from Ezequiel Garay.
20: In the second leg of the Round of 16, Benfica eliminate Tottenham Hotspur after a 2–2 draw. Goals were scored by Ezequiel Garay and Lima.
23: On matchday 24, Benfica beat Académica with a double from Lima and another from Enzo Pérez.
26: In the first leg of the semi-finals of the Portuguese Cup, Benfica lose to Porto at the Estádio do Dragão, with an early header from Jackson Martínez.
30: On matchday 25, Benfica beat Braga at the Estádio Municipal de Braga with a goal from Lima.

April
3: In the first leg of the quarter-finals of the Europa League, Benfica beat AZ at AFAS Stadion with a goal from Eduardo Salvio.
7: On matchday 26, Benfica beat Rio Ave 4–0, with goals from Rodrigo, Nicolás Gaitán and a double from Óscar Cardozo, both from the penalty kick.
10: In the second leg of the quarter-finals of the Europa League, Benfica beat AZ Alkmaar 2–0, with a double from Rodrigo, progressing to face Juventus in the semi-finals.
13: On matchday day 27, Benfica beat Arouca with goals from Rodrigo and Nicolás Gaitán, only needing three points to win the championship with three matches left on the season.
17: In the second leg of the Portuguese Cup semi-finals, Benfica beat Porto 3–1 in a high-profile, high-pressure match, eliminating them and reaching the second consecutive Portuguese Cup final. Goals were scored by Eduardo Salvio, Enzo Pérez and with an individual effort, André Gomes scored the decisive goal.
21: On matchday 28, Benfica beat Olhanense with a double from Lima, winning their record 33rd title, with two games to spare.
24: In the first leg of the Europa League semi-finals, Benfica beat Juventus by 2–1 with goals from Ezequiel Garay and Lima, taking a precious advantage for the second leg.
27: In the semi-finals of the League Cup, Benfica eliminate Porto, this time away at the Estádio do Dragão, on penalty kicks after a null at the end of regular time.

May
1: In the second leg of the semi-finals of the Europa League, Benfica draw to Juventus at Juventus Stadium, eliminating the Italian club from the Europa League. Benfica will play their second consecutive European final, albeit without Enzo Pérez, Lazar Marković and Eduardo Salvio.
4: On matchday 29, an already-crowned Champion and with some key players resting for the upcoming Europa League finals, Benfica faced Vitória de Setúbal and draw 1–1, with a goal from André Gomes.
7: At the League Cup final in Leiria, Benfica beat Rio Ave 2–0, with goals from Rodrigo and Luisão, thus conquering their fifth Taça da Liga.
10: In the final matchday of the championship, a resting Benfica lose to Porto at the Estádio do Dragão 2–1, with a goal from Enzo Pérez. Benfica end the campaign 13 points ahead of rivals Porto.
15: In the Europa League final against Sevilla, Benfica lose on the penalty kicks after Óscar Cardozo and Rodrigo each have their shots defended. It is the club's third loss in the Europa League finals.
18: In the Portuguese Cup final, Benfica defeat Rio Ave with a sole goal from Nicolás Gaitán, conquering their 25th Cup and establishing a record treble, winning both domestic cups and the Primeira Liga championship.

Stadium

Players

Squad information

Transfers in

Total expenditure:  €27.0 million

Transfers out

|}

Total income:  €42.1 million

Technical staff

Pre-season friendlies

Competitions

Overview

Primeira Liga

League table

Results summary

Results by round

Matches

Taça de Portugal

Third round

Fourth round

Fifth round

Quarter-finals

Semi-finals

Final

Taça da Liga

Group stage

Knockout phase

Semi-finals

Final

UEFA Champions League

Benfica began their Champions League campaign in the group stage after achieving a top-two finish in the league's previous season. Courtesy of their UEFA coefficient, they were seeded in Pot 1 for the draw, which took place in Monaco in late August 2013. The final of the competition is to be played at Benfica's home stadium Estádio da Luz.

Group stage

UEFA Europa League

Knockout phase

Round of 32

Round of 16

Quarter-finals

Semi-finals

Final

Overall record

Player statistics

|-
! colspan="15" style="background:#dcdcdc; text-align:center;"| Goalkeepers

|-
! colspan="15" style="background:#dcdcdc; text-align:center;"| Defenders

    
|-
! colspan="15" style="background:#dcdcdc; text-align:center;"| Midfielders

|-
! colspan="15" style="background:#dcdcdc; text-align:center;"| Strikers

|}
(B) –  Benfica B player

Notes

References
Specific

General
 

S.L. Benfica seasons
Benfica
Benfica
Portuguese football championship-winning seasons